An election to Derbyshire County Council took place on 4 May 2017 as part of the 2017 United Kingdom local elections. 64 councillors were elected from 61 electoral divisions which returned either one or two county councillors each by first-past-the-post voting for a four-year term of office. No elections were held in the City of Derby, which is a unitary authority outside the area covered by the County Council. The Conservative Party won back control of the council, taking thirty-seven of the authority's sixty-four seats.

All locally registered electors (British, Irish, Commonwealth and European Union citizens) who were aged 18 or over on Thursday 4 May 2017 were entitled to vote in the local elections. Those who were temporarily away from their ordinary address (for example, away working, on holiday, in student accommodation or in hospital) were also entitled to vote in the local elections, although those who had moved abroad and registered as overseas electors cannot vote in the local elections. It is possible to register to vote at more than one address (such as a university student who had a term-time address and lives at home during holidays) at the discretion of the local Electoral Register Office, but it remains an offence to vote more than once in the same local government election.

Election results

Derbyshire County Council – Results by District

Amber Valley Borough

(10 seats, 9 electoral divisions)

Alfreton and Somercotes

Alport and Derwent

Belper

Duffield and Belper South

Greater Heanor

Heanor Central

Horsley

Ripley East and Codnor

Ripley West and Heage

Bolsover District

(6 seats, 6 electoral divisions)

Barlborough and Clowne

Bolsover North

Bolsover South

Shirebrook and Pleasley

South Normanton and Pinxton

Tibshelf

Chesterfield Borough

(9 seats, 9 electoral divisions)

Birdholme

Boythorpe and Brampton South

Brimington

Loundsley Green and Newbold

Spire

St Mary's

Staveley

Staveley North and Whittington

Walton and West

Derbyshire Dales District
(6 seats, 6 electoral divisions)

Ashbourne

Bakewell

Derwent Valley

Dovedale

Matlock

Wirksworth

Erewash Borough
(9 seats, 9 electoral divisions)

Breadsall and West Hallam

Breaston

Ilkeston East

Ilkeston South

Ilkeston West

Long Eaton

Petersham

Sandiacre

Sawley

High Peak Borough
(8 seats, 7 electoral divisions)

Buxton North and East

Buxton West

Chapel and Hope Valley

Etherow

Glossop and Charlesworth

New Mills

Whaley Bridge

North East Derbyshire District
(8 seats, 7 electoral divisions)

Clay Cross North

Clay Cross South

Dronfield East

Dronfield West and Walton

Eckington and Killamarsh

Sutton

Wingerworth and Shirland

South Derbyshire District
(8 seats, 8 electoral divisions)

Aston

Etwall and Repton

Hilton

Linton

Melbourne

Swadlincote Central

Swadlincote North

Swadlincote South

By-Elections between May 2017 - May 2021

Whaley Bridge

References

2017
2017 English local elections
2010s in Derbyshire